The Hamelin Pool Marine Nature Reserve is a protected marine nature reserve located in the UNESCO World Heritagelisted Shark Bay in the Gascoyne region of Western Australia. The  nature reserve boasts the most diverse and abundant examples of living marine stromatolites in the world, monuments to life on Earth over  million years BP.

Location and access
Hamelin Pool is the eastern major waters within Shark Bay, separated from the western area by the Peron Peninsula, with a smaller water body just adjacent to its northern border with Faure Island - L'Haridon Bight the juncture being defined by Petit Point. At the northern edge of the Hamelin Pool area is the Wooramel Seagrass Bank.
Access is via Hamelin Pool Road and then through the Hamelin Pool Telegraph Station grounds. Access is free.

Marine reserve
It is one of only a few places in the world where living marine stromatolites can be found. Other locations for stromatolites include an underwater site ( deep) in the Caribbean, Persian Gulf, and in the Great Salt Lake of Utah. Hamelin Pool contains the most diverse range of stromatolites and microbial diversity in the world.

The stromatolites in Hamelin Pool were discovered by surveyors working for an oil exploration company in 1956 and were the first living examples of structures built by cyanobacteria. The cyanobacteria living in Hamelin Pool are direct descendants of the oldest form of photosynthetic life on earth. The stromatolites are similar to 3,500 million year old stromatolite fossils found in many places around the world. Stromatolites are an example of the earliest record of life on earth.

Hamelin Pool is hypersaline (it has approximately double the salinity of normal seawater), providing an ideal environment for the stromatolites to grow, and inhibiting other marine life which would normally feed on the bacteria. The cyanobacteria live in communities on the sea bed at densities of 3 billion individuals per square metre. They are the simplest life forms to use photosynthesis to provide food and oxygen. They provided the early Earth with most of its oxygen atmosphere billions of years before plants appeared. Very fine particles of solids i.e. sand, crushed shell etc. are trapped by the sticky bacteria, to become cemented with calcium carbonate produced by the bacteria, thereby building up the stromatolite structures. These are estimated to be over three billion years old.

There are three basic types of stromatolite, the sub-tidal (always under water) columns and the inter-tidal (exposed to air and sun during low tides) anvil or mushroom shapes depicted in most pictures. Algal mats form in the inter-tidal region and appear as areas of flat black mud flats but are actually living stromatolite.

At Hamelin Pool there is an interpretive boardwalk for tourists to venture out and examine the stromatolite structures. This is the only access area for the general public because of the fragile nature of the environment in the Hamelin Pool.

The  Hutchinson Island and the Pelican Island are located within the nature reserve.

Telegraph station

At the Historic Hamelin Pool Telegraph Station built in 1884 and Historic Old Post Office first built in 1886 now the local Community Post Office/Public Phone Box. The museum showing information on the growth of stromatolites and includes what is the only stromatolites living in captivity (in an aquarium) in the world. The museum also covers the building and operation of the Historic Telegraph Station back to the 1880s.

References

Further reading
 (1994) Shark Bay marine reserves draft management plan : Shark Bay Marine Park, Hamelin Pool Marine Nature Reserve Department of Conservation and Land Management for the National Parks and Conservation Authority. Perth, W.A : CALM for the National Parks and Nature Conservation Authority.  "Shark Bay marine reserves draft management plan 1994"—Cover.
 Thomson, Carolyn (1997) Discovering Shark Bay Marine Park and Monkey Mia Como, W.A. Department of Conservation and Land Management. 
 Western Australia & Bancroft, K & Davidson, J (2002). In Field survey of marine ecological communities in Shark Bay Marine Park and Hamelin Pool Marine Nature Reserve (18–29 March 2002) : Marine Management Support, Shark Bay. Dept. of Conservation & Land Management, Marine Conservation Branch, Fremantle, W.A

External links

 Hamelin Pool Marine Nature Reserve

Nature reserves in Western Australia
Natural pools
Shire of Shark Bay
DIWA-listed wetlands